ISO 14617 Graphical symbols for diagrams is a library of graphical symbols for diagrams used in technical applications. ISO 14617 consists of the following parts:

 Part 1: General information and indexes
 Part 2: Symbols having general application
 Part 3: Connections and related devices
 Part 4: Actuators and related devices
 Part 5: Measurement and control devices
 Part 6: Measurement and control functions
 Part 7: Basic mechanical components
 Part 8: Valves and dampers
 Part 9: Pumps, compressors and fans
 Part 10: Fluid power converters
 Part 11: Devices for heat transfer and heat engines
 Part 12: Devices for separating, purification and mixing
 Part 13: Devices for material processing
 Part 14: Devices for transport and handling of material
 Part 15: Installation diagrams and network maps

The standard is developed in cooperation with the International Electrotechnical Commission and has some common elements with IEC 60617 Graphical symbols for diagrams.

History

 ISO 14617-1:2002 was published in September 2002.
 ISO 14617-1:2005 was published in July 2005.

Parts

Part 1: General information and indexes is an introduction with information on registration numbers, rules for presentation and application, and an index to all symbols. The other parts contain the symbols, classified by type or application.

See also
Process flow diagram 
ISO 15519, Specification for diagrams for process industry
ISO 10628, Diagrams for the chemical and petrochemical industry

Notes and references

External links

ISO Online Browsing Platform (OBP) has a searchable database of all symbols in ISO 14617
 

14617